Branton Junior High School is a junior high school in Calgary, Alberta servicing the Banff Trail community and surrounding area. 

It offers a solely French Immersion program for grades 6-9 as part of the mandates of the Calgary Board of Education.

About The School Name

The school was named after William A. Branton who served the Calgary Board of Education as both architect and building superintendent from 1911 to 1956, when he retired. A native of Spalding, England, Branton came to Calgary in 1905 at the age of 16 where he found employment in the construction industry. From 1908 to 1910 he attended Brandon College in Manitoba, and in 1911 he joined the school board under the late Hugh McClellan, then building superintendent. In 1912, Mr. Branton became his assistant and eight years later rose to the position of building superintendent and architect; positions he held until his retirement. He was responsible for the construction of 60 plus schools during his tenure.

About the School

The school was built in 1955 and is situated on 10.092 acres. In 1986 it was significantly damaged by fire at its south end, and much of it was rebuilt to the original plan. The 31 classroom spaces in the building include 3 portables located west of the main building, 1 computer lab, 4 science labs, 2 home economics facilities (cooking, fashion), a drama room, industrial arts facility and a music room. During the late 1980s and early 1990s, some upgrading of the school occurred to science labs, the computer lab and the library (now referred to as the Alf Boldt Resource Centre in recognition of one of its previous principals). The school has a main gymnasium and stage on the main floor, a well-equipped fitness room and a smaller gymnasium below. There is a lunch/kitchen area there as well, and during the lunch hours, the entire lower concourse, gym, and lunchroom provide space for up to 550 students who stay for lunch. The school is famous for its "earthworm," an indoor track facility built by removing earthfill in the crawl spaces below the main building. The initiative was begun in 1960 with the leadership of R.B. Wilberg, physical education instructor and E.M. Borgal, the principal. The area is no longer used (because of poor air quality), as it once was, to train track teams during the winter months.

Beginning in the 2019–2020 school year, due to school board-wide changes, Branton includes students from four grades (Grades 6 to 9) rather than the traditional three for Junior High School (Grade 7 to 9).
The school's science lab was used in the new Ghostbusters 'Afterlife' movie during the summer of 2020.

Options
There are quite a few options in here. Only 7 are offered to grade 7's, but more will be added on for later grades. The options include:
Dance
Art
Drama
Cooking
Fashion
Graphics
Leadership
Applied Technology
Animation
Photography
Multimedia
Industrial Arts or Construction or Woodshop
Band-This is a full year option, so it will take up 2 of the 4 slots for options, since you get 4 options a year, 2 per semester. When band is taken, you get one other option per semester, but  Late Immersion grade 7 must take FSL+ (French Second Language Plus) for the first semester

Band
This school offers a wide selection of instruments, one of the largest for junior high in Calgary. Currently there are 10 instruments.
Oboe
Clarinet
Flute
Trumpet
Bassoon
Trombone
French Horn
Bass Clarinet
Tuba
Baritone or Euphonium
Saxophone 

Band is the largest option in school, with 134 grade 7's in 2010-11.

Immersions

Late Immersion-
This is an immersion where students are having grade 7 as their first year having a French school. They will have separate teachers and curriculum to the Continuing Immersion, who have been in French since Kindergarten/Grade 1. They will learn all the terminology needed for the class.
All French classes include-
Social Studies
Math
Science
FLA (French Language Arts)

Continuing Immersion-
Are with students that are continuing on with French after 6–7 years in school as the main language. They will do the Provincial curriculum but in French. By grade 9, both immersions will be put together in mixed classes.

References

Educational institutions established in 1956
Middle schools in Calgary
1956 establishments in Alberta